In enzymology, an aryl-aldehyde dehydrogenase is an enzyme that catalyzes the chemical reaction

an aromatic aldehyde + NAD+ + H2O  an aromatic acid + NADH + H+

The 3 substrates of this enzyme are aromatic aldehyde, NAD+, and H2O, whereas its 3 products are aromatic acid, NADH, and H+.

This enzyme belongs to the family of oxidoreductases, specifically those acting on the aldehyde or oxo group of donor with NAD+ or NADP+ as acceptor.  The systematic name of this enzyme class is aryl-aldehyde:NAD+ oxidoreductase. This enzyme participates in tyrosine metabolism and biphenyl degradation.

References

 

EC 1.2.1
NADH-dependent enzymes
Enzymes of unknown structure